= Stigmella =

Stigmella is a genus name that may refer to:

- Stigmella (moth), a genus of moths in the family Nepticulidae
- Stigmella (fungus), a plant pathogenic ascomycete fungi genus of uncertain affiliation
